James Louis Flaherty (May 13, 1910 – August 9, 1975) was a bishop of the Catholic Church in the United States. He served as an auxiliary bishop of the Diocese of Richmond from 1966 to 1975.

Biography
Born in Norfolk, Virginia, James Flaherty was ordained a priest on December 8, 1936, for the Diocese of Richmond.  On August 8, 1966 Pope Paul VI appointed Flaherty as the Titular Bishop of Tabuda and Auxiliary Bishop of Richmond.  He was consecrated by Bishop John Russell of Richmond on October 15, 1966. The principal co-consecrators were Bishops Vincent Waters of Raleigh and Joseph Hodges of Wheeling.  Flaherty served as auxiliary bishop until his death on August 9, 1975, at the age of 65.

References

|-

1910 births
1975 deaths
People from Norfolk, Virginia
Roman Catholic Diocese of Richmond
20th-century American Roman Catholic titular bishops 
Religious leaders from Virginia
Catholics from Virginia